Epcar is a surname. Notable people with the surname include: 

 Jon Epcar, American drummer
 Richard Epcar (born 1955), American voice actor, director, and writer